Game Paisa Ladki is a Bollywood Thriller erotic film Produced by Atul Patel & released on 21 September 2018 -shoot in Surat -starring Zakir Hussain, Sitaram Panchal, Ashraful Haque (actor) and Sezal Sharma. Zakir Hussain plays the role of a psycho lover. Singer Kunal Ganjawala recorded a song for the film.

Cast 
 Dipansh Garg
 Sezal Sharma
 Zakir Hussain
 Sitaram Panchal
 Ashraful Haque
 Bhavini Jani

Soundtrack 
The soundtrack of the movie was composed by Dev Sikdar.
 Aiyyashian - Aman Trikha, Neha Kakkar, Varun Likhate
 Naadan Dil - Amit Gupta, Madhavi Shrivastav
 Makhmali Badan - Kunal Ganjawala, Madhavi Shrivastav
 Naadan Dil Reprise - Sabar Koti, Madhvi Shrivastav
 Nasha - Amit Gupta
 Samjhe Janab - Sonu Kakkar
 Game Paisa Ladki - Sabar Koti, Dev Sikdar

References

   5.https://www.bollywoodhungama.com/movie/game-paisa-ladki/box-office/

External links
 https://www.pinkvilla.com/newstags/jubin-nautiyal/323281/jubin-nautiyal-records-song-game-paisa-ladki

Indian erotic thriller films
2018 films
2010s Hindi-language films